Eddie Johnson (February 10, 1919 – June 30, 1974) was an American race car driver.

Born in Richmond, Virginia, Johnson grew up in Los Angeles, where he was a high school acquaintance of 1950 Indianapolis 500 winner Johnnie Parsons. He drove in the AAA and USAC Championship Car series, racing in the 1950–1952 and 1955–1966 seasons with 33 starts, including the Indianapolis 500 races in all of those years but the first two.  He finished in the top ten 9 times, with his best finish in 3rd position, in 1959 at Trenton. Late in his career, Johnson frequently came to Indianapolis without an assigned car only to be signed on to a team which needed a driver to put a struggling car in the race. In 1965, Johnson became the last person on the track in the Indianapolis 500 mile race with a naturally aspirated Offenhauser in a roadster. Johnson was flagged to finish in 10th place.

Johnson died in a plane crash near Cleveland, Ohio.  The National Transportation Safety Board ruled the probable cause was pilot error, specifically attempting to fly visually in unsuitable weather and structurally overloading the airplane.

Indianapolis 500 results

* shared drive with Jim Rathmann
** shared drive with Rodger Ward

During his Indy career, Eddie Johnson drove 4,825 miles without leading a lap. Only Chet Miller and Dick Simon completed more laps at Indianapolis without leading a lap.

World Championship career summary
The Indianapolis 500 was part of the FIA World Championship from 1950 through 1960. Drivers competing at Indy during those years were credited with World Championship points and participation. Eddie Johnson participated in 9 World Championship races and scored 1 World Championship point.

References 

1919 births
1974 deaths
Accidental deaths in Ohio
Aviators killed in aviation accidents or incidents in the United States
Indianapolis 500 drivers
Racing drivers from Virginia
Sportspeople from Richmond, Virginia
Victims of aviation accidents or incidents in 1974